Harry Chinnery (6 February 1876 – 28 May 1916) was an English cricketer. He played 66 first-class matches for Middlesex and Surrey between 1897 and 1910. He was killed in action during World War I.

See also
 List of Surrey County Cricket Club players
 List of cricketers who were killed during military service

References

External links
 

1876 births
1916 deaths
English cricketers
Middlesex cricketers
Surrey cricketers
People from Teddington
British military personnel killed in World War I
Marylebone Cricket Club cricketers
Gentlemen cricketers
Gentlemen of England cricketers
H. D. G. Leveson Gower's XI cricketers
C. I. Thornton's XI cricketers
Military personnel from Middlesex
Oxford University Authentics cricketers
P. F. Warner's XI cricketers
A. J. Webbe's XI cricketers